Dil Wickremasinghe is a broadcaster and journalist living in Ireland. She was a radio presenter with Newstalk and is a panellist  on TV3's Midday programme. She has also done stand-up comedy.

Biography
Born in Rome to Sri Lankan parents, who rejected her at the age of 17 after she told them she was gay and she became homeless as a result. Her mother, a Jehovah's Witness, attempted to "cure" her of her lesbianism after she fell in love with a girl. She is also a survivor of sexual abuse. While in Sri Lanka, she had a job on the radio but was dismissed in a dispute over her sexual orientation. As well as Italy and Sri Lanka, she lived for a time in Bahrain where she dated an Irish woman. She moved to Ireland in 2000; within 24 hours she was dancing down O'Connell Street, singing along to "It's Raining Men" at the Dublin Pride festival, an event which she regarded as crucial to her decision to settle in Ireland.

She later experienced depression and received counselling from One in Four (the charity founded by Colm O'Gorman). She first met her partner, the psychotherapist Anne Marie Toole, when they were forced to share a room at a weekend mental health conference in Wicklow on 30 April 2010, the day of Gerry Ryan's death. They started dating one month later.

In 2014, she announced she was pregnant. In doing so, she became the first lesbian in Irish public life to start a family with her partner. Despite past difficulties with her parents, she reported they were delighted at the idea of becoming grandparents for the first time. During her pregnancy she became a target of David Quinn and his Catholic Iona Institute, as well as numerous other anonymous individuals who questioned her fitness for motherhood.

On 4 February 2014, she received the Lord Mayor of Dublin's Frederick Douglass Award.

References

External links
 Official website
 Dil Wickremasinghe  at Newstalk
 2014 Interview on Ireland AM

1970s births
Living people
Irish LGBT broadcasters
Italian LGBT broadcasters
Lesbian comedians
Italian LGBT comedians
Irish LGBT journalists
Newstalk presenters
Irish women bloggers
Italian women bloggers
Irish women journalists
Italian emigrants to Ireland
Irish people of Sri Lankan descent
Irish lesbian writers
Italian lesbian writers
Italian women journalists
21st-century Italian women writers
21st-century Irish women writers
21st-century LGBT people
Italian people of Sri Lankan descent
Irish LGBT comedians